Apteropanorpidae is a family of wingless scorpionflies containing a single genus, Apteropanorpa, with four named species. These species, also called Tasmanian snow scorpionflies, are found in moss in Tasmania and southern Australia. The adults are generalised predators. The larvae live in moss and are locally common.

Apteropanorpa is probably an austral ecological counterpart of the Northern Hemisphere Boreidae, adapting to colder climates by losing its wings and feeding on the abundant understory mosses. Both groups have been collected on snow and at high elevations. However, these two groups are probably not sister groups, as males of Apteropanorpa have developed the bulbous, recurved abdomen found in advanced families, such as Panorpidae.

The best-known species, Apteropanorpa tasmanica, is known to carry two species of parasitic mites.

Etymology
The genus name is derived from Panorpidae, a related family, and Ancient Greek apteros "wingless".

See also
 Snow scorpionfly (Boreidae), another family of scorpionflies with reduced or no wings

References

Mecoptera
Monogeneric insect families